The 2012 Royal LePage OVCA Women's Fall Classic was held from November 1 to 4 at the North Greenville Curling Club in Kemptville, Ontario as part of the 2012–13 World Curling Tour. The event was held in a triple knockout format, and the purse for the event was CAD$15,000, of which the winner, Rachel Homan, received CAD$5,000. Homan defeated Allison Nimik in the final with a score of 6–1.

Teams
The teams are listed as follows:

Knockout results
The draw is listed as follows:

A event

B event

C event

Playoffs
The playoffs draw is listed as follows:

References

External links

Royal LePage OVCA Women's Fall Classic
Curling in Ontario
Royal LePage OVCA